The Mitsuoka Himiko is a luxury roadster designed and built by Mitsuoka. It is named after Himiko, an obscure shaman queen of Yamataikoku in ancient Wa. In the UK it is known as the Mitsuoka Roadster.

First generation (2008-2018)

Based on the Mazda MX-5 NC, Mitsuoka replaces most of the body panels, fits Fibre-reinforced plastic paneling, leather seats and extends the wheelbase front of the A-pillar to generate the long bonnet line reminiscent of English roadsters such as the Jaguar XK120 and particularly the Morgan Aero 8. Designed by Takanori Aoki, the exterior theme of the Himiko is said to mimic a 'ship riding the high seas cruising majestically as one with the waves'. Transmission and roof options are similar to the MX-5 with the option of either a 6 speed automatic transmission with manual shifting or a 6 speed manual transmission. Each Mitsuoka vehicle is handmade by 45 craftsmen at the Japanese Mitsuoka factory in Toyama City, Japan.

Second generation (2018-present)

The second-generation Himiko was released in 2018. Now based on the Mazda MX-5 ND, the styling remains nearly identical to the previous generation. The retractable hard top previously available was dropped and was replaced with a folding soft top.

External links 

UK website 
Japanese website 

Himiko
Retro-style automobiles

Cars introduced in 2008
2010s cars